The 2017 Desert Diamond West Valley Phoenix Grand Prix was the fourth round of the 2017 IndyCar Series season and the first oval race of the season. It took place on April 29, 2017 at Phoenix International Raceway in Avondale, Arizona. The race was won by Simon Pagenaud for Team Penske, his first ever victory on an oval.

Report

Qualifying
Qualifying was held on Friday, April 28. Hélio Castroneves took pole position, breaking the track record that he had set the previous lap with a time of 37.7538 (194.905 mph). His teammate Will Power qualified second. J. R. Hildebrand qualified third; the only driver outside of Team Penske in the top five. Tony Kanaan in sixth place was the fastest Honda driver.

Race
The race was held on Saturday, April 29. The start saw Hélio Castroneves pull into the lead, while Josef Newgarden was able to move into second after passing both Will Power and J. R. Hildebrand. Behind them, however, the start was chaotic, as Mikhail Aleshin spun in the middle of turn one, triggering a multi-car incident that took out championship leader Sébastien Bourdais, Max Chilton, Marco Andretti, and Graham Rahal. All five were out of the race. Ryan Hunter-Reay suffered a punctured tire in the incident and dropped to 15th following his pit stop.

After a lengthy clean-up, racing resumed on lap 22, where Simon Pagenaud managed to move in front of Hildebrand for fourth place. For several laps, the order remained unchanged. On lap 70, however, Pagenaud was able to catch up to his teammate Power and move himself into third place. Pit stops began shortly after, where Power was able to leapfrog all three of his teammates and take the lead of the race, with Castroneves, Pagenaud, and Newgarden behind. James Hinchcliffe rounded out the top five after the stops. During the cycle, Conor Daly lost numerous laps after suffering a gearbox failure while on pit lane on lap 78.

The order remained largely unchanged for the following stint, though Newgarden, struggling with a broken front wing, lost his fourth position to a hard-charging Hildebrand. At roughly lap 120, the second cycle of pit stops came, during which Alexander Rossi made contact with the wall and was forced to retire from the race, though there was no caution for this incident. Shortly after, however, Rossi's teammate Takuma Sato made contact with the turn four wall and came to a stop on the frontstretch, bringing out the caution. Due to where the pit stop cycle was at the time, Pagenaud now held a sizable advantage on the field, allowing him to pit under yellow without losing any track position.

The restart came on lap 149, where Pagenaud was able to pull out a healthy lead due to several lapped cars being between him and Power. Further back, Newgarden was able to march back up into the top five quickly after finally being afforded the chance to change his front wing. Little change in the order occurred as the field cycled through their final pit cycle from about lap 190 through lap 210. Pagenaud's lead now stood at over 5.5 seconds on lap 215.

Shortly after pit stops, Newgarden's day went awry once again, as he and Ryan Hunter-Reay made contact, breaking Newgarden's front wing again and breaking Hunter-Reay's suspension, taking him out of the race. For the second time in three races, all Andretti Autosport cars were out of the race. Newgarden changed front wings again, dropping him to 10th. The biggest beneficiary of the incident, however, was Hildebrand, who was able to pass both Newgarden and Castroneves, who had slowed up to avoid the incident, boosting him to third place.

Up front, it was smooth sailing for Pagenaud, who came across the finish line over nine seconds ahead of his teammate Power. Hildebrand came across the line third, securing his first podium finish in six years. Castroneves finished fourth while Scott Dixon, who ran an quiet race, finished fifth, the first car one lap down. For Pagenaud, the victory was his 10th career victory and his first ever on an oval. For Team Penske, it was the team's 450th win in motorsports and the 100th IndyCar win for the team on an oval. The victory also allowed Pagenaud to take the lead in the points.
Attendance was 18,500

Results

Qualifying

Source for individual Laps:

Race

Notes:
 Points include 1 point for leading at least 1 lap during a race, an additional 2 points for leading the most race laps, and 1 point for Pole Position.

Source for time gaps:

Championship standings after the race

Drivers' Championship standings

Manufacturer standings

 Note: Only the top five positions are included.

References

External links
 Official Pit Stop Data
 Official Race Broadcast

Desert Diamond West Valley Phoenix Grand Prix
2017 in sports in Arizona
Desert Diamond West Valley Phoenix Grand Prix